Andy Racz was a Hungarian born player that came to the American league as a soccer player who earned one cap with the U.S. national team and played six seasons in the American Soccer League and one season in the International Soccer League.

Professional
Racz' entire professional career, which ran from 1957 to 1964, with the Philadelphia Ukrainians of the American Soccer League.  He was the 1960 league MVP. The Ukrainian Nationals also won the 1960, 1961 and 1963 National Challenge Cup.  In the summer of 1963, Racz played a single season for New York in the International Soccer League, an exhibition league composed of guest teams from Europe and a team of U.S. All Stars. On the completion of the ISL season, Racz returned to Philadelphia where he played with the Ukrainians through the 1963-1964 ASL season.

National team
Racz earned one cap with the U.S. national team in a 10-0 loss to England on May 27, 1964.

He was inducted into the Southeastern Pennsylvania Soccer Hall of Fame in 1990.

References

American soccer players
American Soccer League (1933–1983) players
Hungarian emigrants to the United States
International Soccer League players
Philadelphia Ukrainian Nationals players
United States men's international soccer players
Date of birth unknown
Living people
1932 births

Association footballers not categorized by position